Lebiez  is a commune in the Pas-de-Calais department in the Hauts-de-France region of France.

Geography
A small village situated 10 miles (16 km) east of Montreuil-sur-Mer at the D130 and D108 crossroads and by the banks of the river Créquoise.

Population

Places of interest
 The sixteenth century church of St.Vaast
 A chapel dating from the seventeenth century.

See also
Communes of the Pas-de-Calais department

References

External links

 Lebiez on the Quid website 

Communes of Pas-de-Calais